The 2016–17 College of Charleston Cougars women's basketball team represented the College of Charleston during the 2016–17 NCAA Division I women's basketball season. The Cougars, led by third year head coach Candice M. Jackson, played their home games at the TD Arena and were members of the Colonial Athletic Association. They finished the season 9–21, 6–12 CAA play to finish in seventh place. They lost in the first round of the CAA women's tournament to UNC Wilmington.

Due to the revelation that Charleston had supplied improperly sized basketballs in its home conference wins over William & Mary and UNCW, the CAA announced on February 2 that those games would be treated as Charleston losses for purposes of CAA tournament seeding, although they still count as Charleston wins for all other purposes.

Roster

Schedule

|-
!colspan=9 style="background:#800000; color:#F0E68C;"| Exhibition

|-
!colspan=9 style="background:#800000; color:#F0E68C;"| Non-conference regular season

|-
!colspan=9 style="background:#800000; color:#F0E68C;"| CAA regular season

|-
!colspan=9 style="background:#800000; color:#F0E68C;"| CAA Women's Tournament

See also
2016–17 College of Charleston Cougars men's basketball team

References

College of Charleston Cougars women's basketball seasons
College Of Charleston